"Live" at the London Palladium is a concert album recorded live by the mother and daughter artists Judy Garland and Liza Minnelli. The album peaked at No. 41 on the Billboard charts.

Track listing

Personnel
Harry Robinson Orchestra – orchestra
Harry Robinson – conductor
Norrie Paramor – recording supervisor
Terry O'Neill – photography

References

Liza Minnelli live albums
Judy Garland live albums
1965 live albums
Capitol Records live albums